How To Stop Being a Loser is a 2011 British independent comedy film starring Billy Murray, Gemma Atkinson, Richard E. Grant, Simon Phillips, and Colin Salmon. The film released on 18 November 2011 in the United Kingdom. , none of the seven reviews compiled by Rotten Tomatoes are positive, with an average score of 3.33/10.

Plot
James is useless with women, but his luck changes under the tutelage of pick-up artist, Ampersand. As James learns the art of seduction he begins to wonder about Ampersand's intentions and questions what would truly make him happy in life.

Cast
 Simon Phillips as James
 Gemma Atkinson as Hannah
 Billy Murray as Dr. Leaner
 Richard E. Grant as Ian
 Craig Conway as Ampersand
  Nicola Posener as Emma
 Stephanie Leonidas as "Patch"
 Colin Salmon as Dennis
 Keeley Hazell as Kirsty
 Martin Compston as Adam
 Neil Maskell as Hands Henry
 Martin Kemp as Zeus
 David Easter as Mr. Johnson
 Sheridan Smith as Lisa
  Larissa Houghton as Kelly-Ann
  Dominic Burns as Neil
 Rita Ramnani as Jenny
 Adele Silva as Zara
 Jill Halfpenny as Suzy

See also
 School for Scoundrels

References

External links
 
 Interview with Dominic Burns on the occasion of the DVD release
Interview with Simon Phillips about his role in How To Stop Being A Loser
Interview with Gemma Atkinson on How To Stop Being A Loser

2011 films
British comedy films
Films set in London
British independent films
2011 comedy films
2010s English-language films
Films directed by Dominic Burns
2010s British films